John Parry may refer to:

Musicians
John Parry (Bardd Alaw) (1776–1851), Welsh harpist and composer, and father of John Orlando Parry
John Parry (harpist) (c1710–1782), celebrated blind harpist from Wales
John Parry (Mormon) (1789–1868), early Welsh convert to Mormonism and first conductor of the Mormon Tabernacle Choir
John Orlando Parry (1810–1879), Welsh singer-pianist and comedian, and son of John Parry (Bardd Alaw)
 John Parry, member of Bonzo Dog Doo-Dah Band

Politicians
John Parry (1518-1584), MP for Carmarthen Boroughs (UK Parliament constituency)
John Parry (1724–1797), Welsh Member of Parliament for Caernarvonshire 1780–90 
John Edmund Parry (born 1946), member of the Canadian House of Commons, 1984–1988

Sports
John Parry (American football official) (born 1965), National Football League game official from 2000 to 2018
John Parry (golfer) (born 1986), English professional golfer

Others
John Parry (bishop) (died 1677), Bishop of Ossory 1672–1677
John Parry (editor) (1812–1817) Welsh editor of the Encyclopaedia Cambrensis
John Franklin Parry Hydrographer of the Navy 1914-1919
John Humffreys Parry (1816–1880), English barrister and serjeant-at-law, son of the antiquary
John Humffreys Parry (antiquary) (1786–1825), Welsh barrister and antiquarian
J. H. Parry (1914–1982), maritime historian
John P.M. Parry MBE (1937?-2023), British entrepreneur and engineer

See also 
Jack Parry (1924–2010), Welsh footballer
Jack Parry (English footballer) (born 1931), English footballer with Derby County
Other people surnamed Parry